Japanese cartoon may refer to:

 Manga, Japanese comics and print cartoons
 Anime, Japanese animated cartoons
 Japanese Cartoon (band), a post-punk band featuring Lupe Fiasco